Raja Devi Bakhsh Singh (Hindi: राजा देवी बख्श सिंह, Urdu: راجا دیوی بخش سنگھ) was a British-era King from Gonda, Uttar Pradesh. He was born in 19th century AD. He became popular because of 1857 revolt. He is represented as symbol of communal harmony, his name and the works done by him is still highly respected in neighbouring districts. Today there are few people who know his name but at that the time of 1857 revolt, he displayed valour and bravery and even encouraged harmony between Hindu & Muslim.

Early Life 
He was born in Jigna village of Gonda district. He was 12th king of Gonda  succeeded by 11th king Raja Guman Singh.

He had keen interest in Horse riding, swimming and malla-yuddha.

In Revolt 
On 5 July 1857 Begum Hazrat Mahal sent a letter to king Bakhsh singh during Avadh Revolution for help.

Death 
He moved to Devkhur, Nepal and later died in 1866 because of Malaria.

Library on his name 
Raja Devi Bakhsh Singh Library (Hindi: राजा देवी बख्श सिंह स्मारक बाल पुस्तकालय) was founded on 25 may 1974 by Nagar Palika Gonda. This library is situated infront of Sagar Talab (pond) in Gonda.

See also 

 Indian Rebellion of 1857
 Freedom fighters of India
 Gonda district
 Oudh State

References 

Indian independence activists
Indian Rebellion of 1857
Conflicts in 1857
British East India Company
People from Gonda, Uttar Pradesh
Indian independence activists from Uttar Pradesh
1866 deaths